The Wuling Hongguang V or previously Wuling Rongguang V is a compact Multi-Purpose Vehicle (MPV) produced since 2015 by SAIC-GM-Wuling. Despite being part of the Wuling Hongguang product series, the Wuling Hongguang V features sliding doors instead of hinged ones from the regular Wuling Hongguang MPVs.



First generation

The Wuling Hongguang V was launched previously in January 2015, and later was renamed to Wuling Rongguang V to be sold under the Wuling Rongguang series with prices ranging from 39,800 yuan to 49,800 yuan. Different from the regular Wuling Hongguang, the Wuling Hongguang V or Wuling Rongguang V features sliding doors instead of hinged doors.

Second generation

The second generation Wuling Hongguang V updated the front fascia to a design that's similar to the later revealed second generation Wuling Hongguang (Wuling Hongguang II). The second generation model was sold from 41,800 yuan to 55,800 yuan.

In late March 2021, Chevrolet introduced the N400 van as the Tornado Van in Mexico as a replacement for the Tornado coupé utility, which was discontinued one year prior. It went on sale on 2 August 2021. Being only offered in the LS trim, it is powered by a 1.5 litre engine.

References

External links

 

 Chevrolet Tornado Van (Mexico) (rebranded Wuling Hongguang V)

Hongguang V|Rongguang V
Rear-wheel-drive vehicles
Compact MPVs
Cars introduced in 2015
2010s cars
Cars of China